Lars Markus Granseth, nee Johansson (born 17 February 1983) is a Swedish television presenter. He has presented the SVT children's shows Bolibompa, Sagomattan, Morgonshowen and Random Mix. He has also presented Sommarlov also at SVT. He has also worked with the production of Lilla sportspegeln. He has worked for Radiohjälpen, a help organisation that also sent him to Tanzania to broadcast about the help organisations work in the country for SVT.

He competes as a celebrity dancer in Let's Dance 2022, which is broadcast by TV4. Granseth works as a project manager, producer and program manager at the company Idéstorm AB, which he owns together with Stephan Wilson.

Since August 2008, he has been married to Elisabeth Granseth.

References

Living people
1983 births
Swedish television hosts
People from Alingsås